Sarry may refer to:

Sarry, Marne, a commune in the French region of Champagne-Ardenne
Sarry, Saône-et-Loire, a commune in the French region of Bourgogne
Sarry, Yonne, a commune in the French region of Bourgogne